Theology is the eighth full-length album by Irish singer Sinéad O'Connor. It was released in 2007 on Rubyworks (and Koch Records in the US). The album consists of two discs, the acoustic "Dublin Sessions" and the full-band "London Sessions".

The first single from Theology is "I Don't Know How to Love Him" (an Andrew Lloyd Webber and Tim Rice song from Jesus Christ Superstar). In the issue dated 14 July 2007, the album entered the US Billboard 200 chart at number 168. The album also debuted in the top 20 of Billboard's Independent Albums list at number 15. First-week sales of the album in the US amounted to 4,700 units, while the record also charted in Ireland, France and Italy.

Track listing

Disc one – Dublin Sessions
 "Something Beautiful" (O'Connor) – 5:29
 "We People Who Are Darker Than Blue" (Curtis Mayfield) – 3:56
 "Out of the Depths" (O'Connor) – 5:06
 "Dark I Am Yet Lovely" (O'Connor) – 4:11
 "If You Had a Vineyard" (O'Connor) – 6:18
 "Watcher of Men" (O'Connor, Ron Tomlinson) – 2:34
 "33" (O'Connor, Tomlinson) – 2:33
 "The Glory of Jah" (O'Connor, Tomlinson) – 3:32
 "Whomsoever Dwells" (O'Connor, Tomlinson) – 2:53
 "Rivers of Babylon" (Dowe, McNaughton; additional lyrics by O'Connor) – 2.37
 "Hosanna Filio David" (Traditional) – 0:44

Disc two – London Sessions
 "Something Beautiful" (O'Connor) – 5:15
 "We People Who Are Darker Than Blue" (Curtis Mayfield) – 4:25
 "Out of the Depths" (O'Connor) – 5:03
 "33" (O'Connor, Tomlinson) – 2:43
 "Dark I Am Yet Lovely" (O'Connor) – 3:31
 "I Don't Know How to Love Him" (Andrew Lloyd Webber, Tim Rice) – 4:13
 "If You Had a Vineyard" (O'Connor) – 6:34
 "The Glory of Jah" (O'Connor, Tomlinson) – 4:56
 "Watcher of Men" (O'Connor, Tomlinson) – 3:18
 "Whomsoever Dwells" (O'Connor, Tomlinson) – 5:34
 "Rivers of Babylon" (Dowe, McNaughton) – 4:28

The exclusive edition sold at Best Buy stores in the United States includes five additional live tracks, recorded at Dublin's Sugar Club on 8 November 2006. Two of these, "Something Beautiful" and "If You Had a Vineyard," were made available for download on O'Connor's MySpace page in early 2007.
 "Something Beautiful" – 6:02
 "If You Had a Vineyard" – 6:36
 "The Glory of Jah" – 3:51
 "Whomsoever Dwells" – 3:54
 "33" – 3:19

The Borders-exclusive edition includes three interviews.

Personnel
Sinéad O'Connor – vocals, guitar
Steve Cooney, Hawi Gondwe, Ron Tom (Ron Tomlinson), Sam Cloth Shop – guitar
Mark Gilmour, Andrew Smith – guitar, bass guitar
Robbie Shakespeare – bass guitar
Donald "Don-E" McLean – guitar, bass guitar, piano
Toby Baker – piano
Camilla – harp
Julian Saxi, Neil Williams, Jonah O'Leary – violin
Diana Tice, Natalie Azario – cello
Richard Baylis – French horn
Nathan Tice - flute 
Bev, Chris Brown, Val Staccato – backing vocals
Tommy "Specs" White, Matthew Phillips – drums, percussion
John Reynolds – drums and production assistance on "I Don't Know How To Love Him"

Charts

References

External links 
 

2007 albums
Sinéad O'Connor albums
E1 Music albums
Rubyworks Records albums